Red Cobex is a 2010 Indonesian comedy action feature film. The film was written and directed by Upi, and stars Tika Panggabean, Lukman Sardi, Revalina S. Temat, Sarah Sechan, Indy Barends, Cut Mini, Aida Nurmala, Shanty, and Irfan Hakim. The film was released on June 17, 2010, and is a Starvision Plus production.

Plot
Red Cobex are a gang of mothers from different Indonesian tribes and regions who act as vigilantes to protect the vulnerable and defend the weak while punishing criminals. Mama Ana (Tika Panggabean) and Yopie (Lukman Sardi), her only child, and the Red Cobex avenge gamblers, porn DVD sellers, as well as a jewelry store owned by Albert (Edo Kondologit), Mama Ana’s remarried ex-husband. Eventually the Red Cobex gang are arrested by the police and charged. A year after the arrest, Yopie is released from prison and stays with Ramli (Irfan Hakim), his friend, and then falls in love with Astuti (Revalina S. Temat), but Astuti’s family doesn’t agree with their relationship due to the fact that Yopie’s mother is still imprisoned. When a theft occurs at the restaurant where they work, Yopie is accused of the crime – even by Astuti. Astuti discovers that Yopie was innocent, makes up with him and they are engaged. A riot breaks out during the engagement ceremony. Thugs employed by Mama Ana’s former husband fight the Red Cobex.

Cast
 Tika Panggabean as Mama Ana
 Indy Barends as Tante Lisa
 Aida Nurmala as Yu Halimah
 Sarah Sechan as Mbok Bariah
 Cut Mini as Cik Meymey
 Lukman Sardi as Yopie Papilaya
 Edo Kondologit as Albert
 Irfan Hakim as Ramli
 Shanty as Ipah
 Revalina S. Temat as Astuti

Awards

References

Indonesian comedy films